Sidney Moraes de Almeida Júnior (born 3 March 1977 in Ituiutaba, Minas Gerais), known as Sidney Moraes, is a Brazilian football coach and former player who played as a defensive midfielder. He is the current head coach of ASA.

Honours

Player
São Paulo
Campeonato Paulista: 1998

Sport
Campeonato Paulista: 2000
Copa do Nordeste: 2000

Fluminense
Campeonato Carioca: 2002

Manager
Boa Esporte
Taça Minas Gerais: 2012

Notes

External links

1977 births
Living people
Brazilian footballers
Association football midfielders
Campeonato Brasileiro Série A players
Campeonato Brasileiro Série B players
São Paulo FC players
Sport Club do Recife players
Fluminense FC players
Guarani FC players
Esporte Clube Santo André players
Boa Esporte Clube players
Primeira Liga players
F.C. Penafiel players
S.C. Braga players
C.D. Trofense players
Khaleej FC players
Al Wahda FC players
Al-Ittihad Kalba SC players
Brazil under-20 international footballers
Brazilian expatriate footballers
Expatriate footballers in Portugal
Expatriate footballers in the United Arab Emirates
Brazilian expatriate sportspeople in Portugal
Brazilian expatriate sportspeople in the United Arab Emirates
Brazilian football managers
Campeonato Brasileiro Série B managers
Campeonato Brasileiro Série C managers
Boa Esporte Clube managers
Associação Desportiva Recreativa e Cultural Icasa managers
Associação Atlética Ponte Preta managers
Vila Nova Futebol Clube managers
Clube Náutico Capibaribe managers
Paysandu Sport Club managers
UAE First Division League players
UAE Pro League players
Saudi Professional League players
União Recreativa dos Trabalhadores managers
Ferroviário Atlético Clube (CE) managers
Agremiação Sportiva Arapiraquense managers